Raymond "Ray" Kelley is an American cellist and record producer. He is one of the cellists on The Simpsons: Testify and Family Guy: Live in Vegas, and Grammy Award winning Jonathan Livingston Seagull soundtrack album.

Since 1956, he has performed classical music for six years in the Dallas Symphony Orchestra, then five years with the Los Angeles Philharmonic orchestra until 1968. Kelley was a part of a Hollywood session musician group named the Abnuceals Emuukha Electric Symphony Orchestra from 1959 to 1974. He has played cello on many major recording artists' albums over the years.

In 1988, he founded his own record label, Resort Music, Inc.

Discography
 1990 – Oasis
 1991 – Destinations
 1993 – From the Heart
 1995 – Windy City
Featured on

1966 – Freak Out!, The Mothers of Invention
1968 – The Birds, The Bees & The Monkees, The Monkees
1972 – Hot August Night, Neil Diamond
1974 – Here Comes Inspiration, Paul Williams
1977 – From Me to You, George Duke
1980 – Faces, Earth, Wind & Fire
1983 – The Clarke/Duke Project II, Stanley Clarke

References

External links
Ray Kelley at AllMusic
Ray Kelley at Discogs

Living people
American cellists
Musicians from Los Angeles
Year of birth missing (living people)